Nikolai Sergeyev may refer to:

  (1855-1919), Russian painter
 Nicholas Sergeyev (1876–1951), Russian choreographer and ballet master
 Nikolai Sergeyev (actor) (1894–1988), Russian actor
 Nikolai Sergeyev (painter) (1908–1989), Russian painter
 Nikolai Sergeyev (admiral) (1909–1999), Admiral of the Fleet of the Soviet Navy